Pwlldu Bay or Pwll Du Bay is a small beach on the south Gower Peninsula coast in south Wales.  It is one of the more remote beaches and is not easily accessible by car, but there are several good footpaths leading to it.

There is a nearby gully called Grave's End marked by a circle of limestone rocks.  A number of people from a shipwreck that was found on the bay were buried in this gully.  The ship was the Caesar which was wrecked on the beach on 28 November 1760.

Pwlldu means "Black Pool" in Welsh

External links
Welcome to Gower: Pwlldu Bay
Enjoy Gower: Pwlldu Bay

Bays of the Gower Peninsula
Sites of Special Scientific Interest in West Glamorgan